Zhangjiang Hi-Tech Park is a station on Line 2 of the Shanghai Metro. From 14 to 23 February 2010, this station was shut down, and Line 2 service terminated at Longyang Road, to allow for reconstruction work; the new underground Zhangjiang Hi-Tech Park station was built on the northeast side of the old, elevated station.

The station connects to the Zhangjiang Tram .

Gallery

Places nearby
 Zhangjiang High-Tech Park
 Fudan University, Zhangjiang Campus

References

Shanghai Metro stations in Pudong
Railway stations in China opened in 2000
Railway stations in China opened in 2010

Line 2, Shanghai Metro
Railway stations in Shanghai